Édouard Yves (born 26 October 1907, date of death unknown) was a Belgian Olympic foil and sabre fencer. He won a bronze medal in the team foil event at the 1948 Summer Olympics.

References

External links
 

1907 births
Year of death missing
Belgian male sabre fencers
Belgian male foil fencers
Olympic fencers of Belgium
Fencers at the 1928 Summer Olympics
Fencers at the 1948 Summer Olympics
Fencers at the 1952 Summer Olympics
Olympic bronze medalists for Belgium
Olympic medalists in fencing
Medalists at the 1948 Summer Olympics